Putnam County is a county in the U.S. state of West Virginia. As of the 2020 census, the population was 57,440. Its county seat is Winfield and its largest city is Hurricane.  Putnam County is part of the Huntington-Ashland, WV-KY-OH Metropolitan Statistical Area, across the Kanawha River from Charleston, West Virginia.

History
The Virginia General Assembly formed Putnam County on March 11, 1848, from parts of Cabell, Kanawha and Mason counties. It was named for Israel Putnam, who was a hero in the French and Indian War and a general in the American Revolutionary War. George Washington surveyed the area in 1770. Winfield, the county seat, had been founded in 1818 but was incorporated on February 21, 1868, and named to honor General Winfield Scott a General during the Mexican American War and early stage of the Civil War.

Slavery was a divisive issue in Putnam County before and during the Civil War. In the Virginia Secession Convention of 1861, Putnam County voters elected James W. Hoge to represent them, and he voted against secession on April 17, 1861, when the convention passed the secession ordinance. However, he returned to Richmond for the second session in June, and signed the ordinance. No one from Putnam county attended the Wheeling Convention which ultimately led to the creation of the state of West Virginia in 1863.

Two minor battles were fought in Putnam County during the Civil War. On July 17, 1861, Confederate soldiers defeated a Union force at the Battle of Scary Creek, before withdrawing to Charleston. The Confederates included a cavalry troop raised by Colonel Albert Gallatin Jenkins, who until Virginia's secession from the Union had represented the area in Congress. Jenkins would be commissioned a brigadier general in 1862, but died of wounds received at the Battle of Cloyd's Mountain in May, 1864. The second skirmish occurred on October 24, 1864, after West Virginia became a Union state. Confederate troops seized and sank a Union steamboat on the Kanawha River near Winfield, then attacked the courthouse, but the "Battle of Winfield" ended as a Union victory. Putnam County's Civil War soldiers were about evenly split between Union and Confederate, with about four hundred on each side.

Putnam County was one of fifty Virginia counties admitted to the Union as the state of West Virginia on June 20, 1863. Later that year, its counties were divided into civil townships, with the intention of encouraging local government. This proved impractical in the heavily rural state, and in 1872 the townships were converted into magisterial districts. Putnam County was initially divided into six townships: Buffalo, Curry, Grant, Hutton, Scott, and Union. These became magisterial districts in 1872, and the following year two were renamed, with Grant becoming Teays Valley, while Hutton became Pocatalico. Except for minor adjustments, these districts were largely unchanged until the 1980s, when Buffalo and Union Districts were consolidated into Buffalo-Union District, and Teays Valley's name abbreviated to "Teays".

A railroad was rebuilt through Putnam County in 1875.

Geography
The Kanawha River flows north-northwestward through the center of Putnam County. The county terrain consists of wooded hills, carved with drainages. The terrain slopes to the north, with the highest point near its SW corner at 1,129' (344m) ASL.

Major highways

  Interstate 64
  U.S. Route 35
  U.S. Route 60
  West Virginia Route 25
  West Virginia Route 34
  West Virginia Route 62
  West Virginia Route 817
  West Virginia Route 869

Adjacent counties

 Mason County - north
 Jackson County - northeast
 Kanawha County - east
 Lincoln County - south
 Cabell County - west

Demographics

2000 census
As of the census of 2000, there were 51,589 people, 20,028 households, and 15,281 families in the county. The population density was 149/sqmi (57.6/km2). There were 21,621 housing units at an average density of 62.5/sqmi (24.1/km2). The racial makeup of the county was 97.97% White, 0.56% Black or African American, 0.16% Native American, 0.58% Asian, 0.02% Pacific Islander, 0.13% from other races, and 0.59% from two or more races. 0.51% of the population were Hispanics or Latinos of any race.

There were 20,028 households, out of which 35.40% had children under the age of 18 living with them, 64.20% were married couples living together, 8.90% had a female householder with no husband present, and 23.70% were non-families. 20.60% of all households were made up of individuals, and 7.90% had someone living alone who was 65 years of age or older. The average household size was 2.56 and the average family size was 2.96.

The county population contained 25.00% under the age of 18, 7.60% from 18 to 24, 30.40% from 25 to 44, 25.50% from 45 to 64, and 11.60% who were 65 years of age or older. The median age was 38 years. For every 100 females there were 96.70 males. For every 100 females age 18 and over, there were 93.50 males.

The median income for a household in the county was $41,892, and the median income for a family was $48,674. Males had a median income of $40,782 versus $23,532 for females. The per capita income for the county was $20,471. About 7.10% of families and 9.30% of the population were below the poverty line, including 11.30% of those under age 18 and 7.60% of those age 65 or over.

2010 census
As of the census of 2010, there were 55,486 people, 21,981 households, and 16,176 families in the county. The population density was 160/sqmi (61.9/km2). There were 23,438 housing units at an average density of 67.7/sqmi (26.2/km2). The racial makeup of the county was 96.8% white, 0.9% black or African American, 0.7% Asian, 0.2% American Indian, 0.3% from other races, and 1.1% from two or more races. Those of Hispanic or Latino origin made up 0.9% of the population. In terms of ancestry, 13.2% were American, 12.9% were German, 11.3% were English, and 10.6% were Irish.

Of the 21,981 households, 33.6% had children under the age of 18 living with them, 59.6% were married couples living together, 9.5% had a female householder with no husband present, 26.4% were non-families, and 22.3% of all households were made up of individuals. The average household size was 2.51 and the average family size was 2.93. The median age was 40.9 years.

The median income for a household in the county was $52,618 and the median income for a family was $63,642. Males had a median income of $51,837 versus $31,198 for females. The per capita income for the county was $25,857. About 8.5% of families and 10.4% of the population were below the poverty line, including 15.6% of those under age 18 and 6.5% of those age 65 or over.

Politics
Putnam County voters have traditionally voted Republican. In only one national election since 1964 has the county selected the Democratic candidate.  The Putnam County Republican Party has traditionally been very active. The Republican Party in Putnam County maintains active Executive Committees and a Republican Club.

Communities

Cities
 Hurricane
 Nitro (part)

Towns

 Bancroft
 Buffalo
 Eleanor
 Poca
 Winfield (county seat)

Magisterial districts
 Buffalo-Union
 Curry
 Pocatalico
 Scott
 Teays

Census-designated places
 Culloden (part)
 Hometown
 Teays Valley

Unincorporated communities

 Black Betsy
 Confidence
 Extra
 Fraziers Bottom
 Lanham
 Liberty
 Midway
 Pliny
 Plymouth
 Raymond City
 Red House
 Scary
 Scott Depot
 Teays

See also
 Amherst-Plymouth Wildlife Management Area
 National Register of Historic Places listings in Putnam County, West Virginia

References

External links
 Official website for Putnam County

 
1848 establishments in Virginia